Mandrake the Magician (1939) is the seventh serial released by Columbia Pictures. It was based upon the King Features comic strip of the same name.

Plot
Mandrake and his assistant Lothar are working the cruise lines and make the acquaintance of Professor Houston who has developed a radium energy machine, which is much coveted by a masked crime lord known as "The Wasp". The Wasp unleashes his army of accomplices in waves to steal the invention by any means necessary. Mandrake and his allies finally catch up to "The Wasp" and discover the crime lord is actually scientist Dr. Andre Bennett, posing as a close friend of Houston.

Cast
 Warren Hull as Mandrake the Magician
 Doris Weston as Betty Houston
 Al Kikume as Lothar, Mandrake's Assistant
 Rex Downing as Tommy Houston
 Edward Earle as Dr. Andre Bennett/The Wasp
 Forbes Murray as Professor Houston
 Kenneth MacDonald as James Webster
 Don Beddoe as Frank Raymond
 Dick Curtis as Dorgan, a henchman
 John Tyrrell as Dirk, the "spearpoint heavy" (chief henchman)
 Lester Dorr as Gray

Chapter titles
 Shadow on the Wall
 Trap of the Wasp
 A City of Terror
 The Secret Passage
 The Devil's Playmate
 The Fatal Crash
 Gamble for Life
 Across the Deadline
 Terror Rides the Rails
 The Unseen Monster
 At the Stroke of Eight
 The Reward of Treachery
Source:

See also
List of film serials by year
List of film serials by studio

References

External links

Cinefania.com

1939 films
1930s English-language films
American black-and-white films
1939 fantasy films
1939 crime films
Columbia Pictures film serials
Films about magic and magicians
Films based on comic strips
Films directed by Sam Nelson
American fantasy films
American crime films
Films with screenplays by Joseph F. Poland
1930s American films